Paul Moorfoot (born 3 March 1960) is an Australian swimmer. He competed in three events at the 1980 Summer Olympics.

References

External links
 

1960 births
Living people
Australian male backstroke swimmers
Australian male butterfly swimmers
Australian male medley swimmers
Olympic swimmers of Australia
Swimmers at the 1980 Summer Olympics
Swimmers at the 1978 Commonwealth Games
Commonwealth Games bronze medallists for Australia
Commonwealth Games medallists in swimming
Place of birth missing (living people)
20th-century Australian people
Medallists at the 1978 Commonwealth Games